
Khariton is a variant of the Greek  name Chariton. It may refer to:

Surname
 Yulii Khariton (1904–1996), Russian physicist

Given name
Khariton Korotkevich (1882–1904), the pseudonym of Haritina Korotkevich, Russian soldier
Khariton Laptev (1700–1763), Russian naval officer
Khariton Platonov (1842-1907), Russian painter
Khariton Chebotaryov (1746-1815), Russian academic

Other
 9263 Khariton, an asteroid

See also
 Chariton (disambiguation)
 Hariton
 Kharitonov, a surname, a patronymic derivation of the name